Iran Women's national inline hockey team represents Iran at international inline hockey competitions for women.

Current Staff
Technical Director:   Maliheh Khorrambagheri
Head Coach:   Marina Fagoaga Jalinier
Coach:   Saba Valadkhani  
Staff Member:   Farzaneh Samimi

Team Roster
The following 16 players have been invited to take part in Roller Hockey Asia Cup which will be held in China in October 2016.

? - Sousan Ghasemi (Goalie)
? - Behnaz Sarbazi (Goalie)
1 - Samaneh Nazeri (Goalie)
? - Mahsa Shadan (Defence)
? - Sadaf Mansouri (Defence)
13 - Faezeh Modabber (Defence) [Vice Captain]
26 - Hoda Ahmadbegi (Defence) [Vice Captain]
66 - Helia Sohani (Defence) [Captain]
67 - Sara Satarian (Defence)
88 - Maryamalsadat Seyedmahmoud (Defence)
7 -  Maral Rasekhi (Forward)
12 - Marzieh Seyedghandi (Forward)
17 - Bita Mohsenizadehtehrani (Forward)
18 - Azamossadat Sanaei (Forward)
33 - Azin Gharouni (Forward)
99 - Samaneh Heydari (Forward)

Tournaments

Asian Roller Skating Championship - Inline Hockey International Cup

FIRS World Championship

Open Championship

References 

Inline hockey in Iran
National inline hockey teams
Inline